Pogonin is a Russian masculine surname, its feminine counterpart is Pogonina. Notable people with the surname include:

Mikhail Pogonin (born 1996), Russian football player
Natalia Pogonina (born 1985), Russian chess player

Russian-language surnames